The 2012 Formula Renault 2.0 Alps Series is the second year of the Formula Renault 2.0 Alps series, and the eleventh season of the former Swiss Formula Renault Championship. The championship began on 24 March at Monza and will finish on 21 October at Barcelona after fourteen races held at seven meetings.

The second-year drivers shined in the opening weekend at Monza. The first pole position of the season was claimed by Tech 1's Paul-Loup Chatin, but in the first race he was passed by Red Bull-backed Koiranen's Daniil Kvyat and 2011 Junior champion Melville McKee. Kvyat, who set the second fastest time in qualifying, dominated in both races and left Monza with 53 of 54 possible points.

Drivers and teams

Race calendar and results
The seven-event calendar for the 2012 season was announced on 22 November 2011. The series supported Italian Renault Clio Cup events at all Italian circuits in the schedule and on the Red Bull Ring with Pau Grand Prix, FIA Formula Two Championship round at Spa and World Series by Renault round at Barcelona.

 1 In the qualifying session at Pau, drivers were divided in two groups. Paul-Loup Chatin and Norman Nato both scored an additional point for the fastest time in each of the split qualifying groups.

Championship standings

Drivers' Championship

Juniors' championship

Teams' championship
Prior to each round of the championship, two drivers from each team – if applicable – are nominated to score teams' championship points.

References

External links
 Official website of the Formula Renault 2.0 Alps championship

Alps
Formula Renault 2.0 Alps
Renault Alps